Augsburg University is a private university in Minneapolis, Minnesota. It is affiliated with the Evangelical Lutheran Church in America. It was founded in 1869 as a Norwegian-American Lutheran seminary known as Augsburg Seminarium. Today, the university enrolls approximately 3,000 undergraduate students and 800 graduate students. The university is known for its emphasis on service learning; volunteering in the community is both an instructional strategy and a required part of a student's coursework.

History

Augsburg was founded as a seminary by Norwegian Lutherans. It was named after the Augsburg Confession of 1530, the primary confession of faith presented by Lutherans in Augsburg, Germany, and contained in the Book of Concord of 1580. Augsburg Seminarium opened in September 1869, in Marshall, Wisconsin. Three years later, by 1873, it moved to Minneapolis, changing its name to The Norwegian Danish Evangelical Lutheran Augsburg Seminary to reflect the name of the church body that sponsored the school. Expanding its mission, undergraduate classes began in the fall of 1874, with the first class graduating in the spring of 1879. In 1892, the school's name was shortened to Augsburg Seminary. In 1893, reacting to what it deemed overly-hierarchical elements in the Norwegian church, Augsburg leaders organized the "Friends of Augsburg", which, by 1897 had coalesced to form a new Lutheran denomination, the Lutheran Free Church, a body that flourished for 70 years. During its early years the college and seminary served men only, with women first admitted to the college in the fall of 1921. To further expand its mission, a high school level Augsburg Academy was provided on the campus until it closed in 1933.

Augsburg Seminary remained the name of the school until 1942, when its name was officially changed and expanded to Augsburg College and Theological Seminary, a name that had been informally used since the 1910s. When the Lutheran Free Church merged with the much larger American Lutheran Church (ALC) in 1963, Augsburg Seminary merged with the ALC's Luther Theological Seminary, later renamed Luther Seminary. The name of the remaining undergraduate college became Augsburg College. In 2017, the name of the school officially became Augsburg University.

August Weenaas was Augsburg's first president (1869-1876). Weenaas recruited two teachers from Norway—Sven Oftedal and Georg Sverdrup. These three men clearly articulated the direction of Augsburg: to educate Norwegian Lutherans to minister to immigrants and to provide such "college" studies as would prepare students for theological study.

In 1874, they proposed a three-part plan: first, train ministerial candidates; second, prepare future theological students; and third, educate the farmer, worker, and businessman. The statement stressed that a good education is also practical. Augsburg's next two presidents also emphatically rejected ivory tower concepts of education. This commitment to church and community has led to Augsburg's theme of over 130 years: Education for Service.

This seminarian focus began to change after World War I. In 1911, George Sverdrup Jr. became president. He worked to develop college departments with an appeal to a broader range of students than just those intending to be ministers. In 1937, Augsburg elected Bernhard Christensen, an erudite and scholarly teacher, to be president (1938-1962). His involvement in ecumenical and civic circles made Augsburg a more visible part of church and city life. After World War II, Augsburg leaders made vigorous efforts to expand and improve academic offerings. Thus by mid-century, the undergraduate college had become a larger part of the institution than the seminary and received the most attention.

As a result, Augsburg steadily added departments essential to a liberal arts college, offering a modern college program based on general education requirements and elective majors. Augsburg aims to reflect the commitment and dedication of its founders who believed "an Augsburg education should be preparation for service in community and church", [by] "Providing an education grounded in vocational calling, that provides students both the theoretical learning and the practical experience to succeed in a global, diverse world."

Church affiliations

Presidents

Academics
Augsburg University is accredited by the Higher Learning Commission. The student-faculty ratio at Augsburg University is 16:1, and the school has 64.4 percent of its classes with fewer than 20 students.  Augsburg offers undergraduate degrees in over 50 major areas of study. The university also grants eight graduate degrees, including an MBA program. Augsburg offers one doctoral degree, the Doctor of Nursing Practice. Its most popular undergraduate majors, based on number, out of 533 graduates in 2022, were:
Nursing Administration (65)
Biology/Biological Sciences (32)
Marketing/Marketing Management (32)
Psychology (27)
Elementary Education and Teaching (26)
Business Administration and Management (25)

Rankings
Augsburg University was one of six higher education institutions in the nation to receive the 2010 Presidential Award for Community Service, the highest honor in the annual President's Higher Education Community Service Honor Roll. U.S. News & World Report magazine named Augsburg, in 2013, as one of the best colleges for service-learning, which includes 31 schools across the country where volunteering in the community is both an instructional strategy and a requirement of a student's coursework. According to the U.S. News & World Report 2013 rankings, Augsburg University was 23rd in its Regional University Midwest Ranking. USN&WR also consistently ranks Augsburg as a Tier 1 institution for its Physician Assistant program. In 2013, Augsburg ranked #70 in the nation. Augsburg shared the #70 rank with the following institutions: University of Southern California, Western University of Health Sciences, and the University of New England.

Campus

Residence halls

 Urness Hall is the first-year building. It has 9 floors of traditional-style residence hall rooms (plus two other floors), with one co-ed floor. Each floor is led by a resident advisor (RA).
 Mortensen Hall (known as Mort) is connected to the Urness Hall lobby and has 13 floors of apartment-style housing (eight apartments on every floor). It is the tallest building on the campus. Mortensen Hall is named for Gerda Mortensen, Dean of Women at Augsburg University between 1923 and 1964.
 Anderson Hall is a four-story building with four different styles of housing available. These include single person suites, four person apartments, eight person townhomes (two floors), and 15 person floorhouses.
 Martin Luther Residence Hall (also known as Luther Hall) was built in 1999 using state funding.  It was originally named New Hall because there was no major contributor to name the hall for. It assumed its current name on October 1, 2007, when the completion of the Oren Gateway Center made the old name misleading. Luther Hall has studios, two bedroom, and four bedroom apartments. The apartments all consist of single or double person rooms and have a full kitchen.
 The Oren Gateway Center is a substance-free residence hall and houses students in the StepUP program, as well as other students who choose sober living. It has rooms for 106 students and also contains six classrooms and an art gallery.

Other buildings

Old Main is the oldest building on campus and is still in use today. It is listed on the National Register of Historic Places.
 The Christensen Center contains admissions offices, the cafeteria, a coffee shop, computers, and an art gallery, It formerly housed the bookstore until August 2007, after which the bookstore moved to the Oren Gateway Center. On March 28, 2008, a student lounge opened in the former bookstore space. It is connected by skyway to Urness Hall/Mortensen Hall.
 Sverdrup Hall (formerly known as Sverdrup Library until the completion of the Lindell Library in 1998) contains the Enrollment Center and Registrar's Office as well as several class rooms and computer labs on the upper level.
 The James G. Lindell Library has four levels containing approximately 190,000 items. The second floor of the library is home to the Gage Center for Student Success, which has offices for Academic Advising, the Center for Learning and Accessible Student Services (CLASS), and Augsburg's offices of the Federal TRIO Programs. The library is connected to Sverdrup Hall, the Oren Gateway Center, and the Hagfors Center for Business, Science, and Religion by skyway.
 The Foss Center for Worship, Drama and Communication contains the chapel, a theater, and several classrooms.
 Sverdrup Hall and Oftedal Memorial Hall contains offices for the college's professors.
 The Norman and Evangeline Hagfors Center for Science, Business, and Religion is the newest building on campus and also the largest.

Future expansion
Several new facilities are currently planned including a new residence hall to replace the Science Hall, a parking ramp, and other buildings.

Student life
Augsburg's student body totals approximately 3,800 students representing some 40 states, more than 40 foreign countries, and 24 tribal nations/reservations. The college is involved in providing services to students with physical or learning disabilities. StepUP is Augsburg's program for students in recovery from drug and alcohol abuse. The program provides a sober environment for about 60 students in the Oren Gateway Center . The program claims an excellent success rate: 84% abstinence over 538 people between 1997 and 2007.

The on-campus diversity is enhanced by Augsburg's location in the Cedar-Riverside neighborhood, the Twin Cities' most culturally diverse neighborhood. The largest concentration of Somali immigrants in the U.S. is located throughout the Augsburg neighborhood, and one of the largest urban Native American populations is within one mile. Augsburg is also located in the heart of a major theater center. The university has been designated as a Minnesota Indian Teacher Training Program site. Internationally, Augsburg maintains a relationship with the United International College, in southern China.

Campus organizations 
Augsburg students have opportunities for involvement in more than 50 clubs and organizations, including student academic societies, publications, Student Government, Augsburg Business Organization, Augsburg Asian Student Association, Campus Ministry, Augsburg University Pre-law Society, Pan-Afrikan and Pan-Asian Student Union, forensics, cheerleading, Amnesty International, Intertribal Student Union and the Hispanic/Latino Student Association.

There are presently no fraternity or sorority groups on campus, although some students participate in nearby University of Minnesota Greek Life.

The Echo 

The Echo is the student-produced newspaper for the university. It consists of eight pages divided into five sections: News, Opinions and Editorials, Sports, Arts and Entertainment, and Features. The paper is printed in black and white on tabloid-sized recycled paper.

KAUG 
KAUG is Augsburg's student radio station, based in the Auggies' Nest in the basement of Christensen Center. KAUG streams 24 hours-a-day online through their website and can be heard on the airwaves on 91.7 FM within a 2-mile radius of the campus.

KAUG provides a venue for a number of DJs, who play several genres of music and talk radio.

Marginalized Voices in Film and Media 
Originally known as "Women in Film", Marginalized Voices in Film and Media (MVFM) is a student group dedicated to the advancement of women and other minorities in the film and television industry. The group discusses the depiction of minorities on the screen and their roles behind the camera.

Queer Pride Alliance 
Known as "Queer and Straight In Unity" (QSU) until 2014, and originally incorporated as "BAGLS" in 1988, Queer Pride Alliance (QPA) is Augsburg's lesbian, gay, bisexual, transgender, queer, intersex, and asexual support group. After the hostile campus environment towards LGBTQIA individuals culminated in several anti-LGBTQIA incidences in 2003, students occupied administrator offices to protest the university's lack of action. In response, Augsburg established the GLBTQIA Student Services office (today known as the LGBTQIA Student Services office), which became the primary point of contact and support for QSU and the LGBTQIA student body. QPA is advised by the director of the LGBTQIA Student Services office, which jointly provides the campus community with workshops, performances, weekly group meetings, and speakers, as well as exposing students to the wider Midwestern LGBTQIA rights movement by sponsoring retreats and trips to conferences. Today, the university is certified Reconciling in Christ by ReconcilingWorks, which means that in accordance with its theological values, it welcomes and actively affirms "all people in regard to their gender expression, gender identity, and sexual orientation."

Notable alumni

 Peter Agre, M.D., 1970, the 2003 Nobel Prize winner in Chemistry and faculty member at the Johns Hopkins University School of Medicine.
 Susan Allen, 1992, first Native American woman elected to the Minnesota state legislature, and first openly lesbian Native American to win election to a state legislature.
 Jill Billings, 1990, Wisconsin State Assembly
 Rev. Herbert W. Chilstrom, 1954, Retired (and the first) Presiding Bishop of the ELCA
 Otis Dozovic, 2011, WWE professional wrestler, 2017 Rookie of the Year. 
 Devean George, 1999, former National Basketball Association player for the Los Angeles Lakers, the Dallas Mavericks, and the Golden State Warriors
 Rev. Mark Hanson, 1971, former Presiding Bishop of the ELCA
 Kelly D. Holstine, 2007, winner of Education Minnesota's 2018 Minnesota Teacher of the Year award
 Roger Huerta, former wrestler, mixed martial artist once competing in the Ultimate Fighting Championship and Bellator Fighting Championship
 Marcus LeVesseur, 2007, 4-time Wrestling National Champion (2003–05, 2007), 4-time Minnesota State High School Wrestling Champion (1998–2001). LeVesseur is the first Division III wrestler with four national titles. He is only the second college wrestler ever to finish his career unbeaten and untied, with a 155–0 career record (Cael Sanderson was the first). LeVesseur is currently competing in Mixed Martial Arts.
 Lute Olson, 1956, basketball coach at University of Iowa and Arizona, coached Arizona to a national championship.
 Anne Panning, 1988, writer, winner of 2006 Flannery O'Connor Award for Super America
 Oscar S. Paulson, 1914, Wisconsin State Senate
 James Pederson, 1934, played in the National Football League from 1930 to 1932 with the Minneapolis Red Jackets, Frankford Yellow Jackets, and Chicago Bears.
 Martin Sabo, 1959, former Minnesota State Representative (1961-1978) and U.S. Congress Representative (1979-2007).
 Dave Stevens, 1991, amputee athlete born without legs, who played college football. Only congenital amputee to ever play college sports.
 Jane Jeong Trenka, activist, author, and winner of a Minnesota Book Award

Athletics 
The Augsburg Auggies are a member of the Minnesota Intercollegiate Athletic Conference (MIAC). Augsburg University participates in NCAA Division III Athletics. The wrestling team has won thirteen NCAA Division III National team wrestling champions: 1991, 1993, 1995, 1997, 1998, 2000, 2001, 2002, 2005, 2007, 2010, 2015 and 2018. The men's hockey team had won 3 NAIA national ice hockey championships in 1978, 1981 and 1982.

Men's Varsity Sports (9): baseball, basketball, cross country, football, golf, ice hockey, soccer, track & field, wrestling
Women's Varsity Sports (10): basketball, cross country, golf, ice hockey, lacrosse, soccer, softball, swimming, track & field, volleyball

Conference championships

 "c" indicates co-champions
 * As of 2003, Wrestling is no longer a MIAC sponsored sport

See also

 List of colleges and universities in Minnesota
 Higher education in Minnesota

Notes

References
Chrislock, Carl H. "From Fjord to Freeway: 100 years, Augsburg College" (Minneapolis: Augsburg College 1969)

External links
 Official website

 
Educational institutions established in 1869
Universities and colleges in Minneapolis
Private universities and colleges in Minnesota
1869 establishments in Minnesota
Universities and colleges accredited by the Higher Learning Commission